The Death of the Horse is a 1992 Albanian film directed by Saimir Kumbaro that stars Timo Flloko, Rajmonda Bulku, and Niko Kanxheri. The film is noted for being the first anti-communist Albanian film about the dictatorship of Enver Hoxha.

Plot
In 1975 in Albania a respected general, who had set up an army stud to improve the nation's horses, is sentenced to death for allegedly plotting a coup against the communist dictatorship of Enver Hoxha. To extirpate all traces of his work, the regime decides to destroy the stud by announcing that the horses are sick and must be shot. Agron, a devoted officer at the stud who knows that the horses are not sick, offers to shoot a beautiful Arab stallion he loves. Taking it out into the country, he gives it to some gypsies.

The commissar at the stud suspects what has happened and denounces Agron. After being arrested and beaten, he is put on trial where, despite testimony from the commandant of the stud who knows the commissar's malice, he is sentenced to fifteen years. His parents are evicted from their flat and sent into exile. Under pressure from her family, his pregnant wife files for divorce and then dies after a backstreet abortion.

Agron is released while the streets are full of jubilant citizens celebrating the overthrow of the dictatorship. With no family to go to, he is walking the street when he bumps into the ex-commissar, newly elected to Parliament. The man promises that he did everything he could to save Agron and will now do anything he can to help. Agron walks on alone.

Cast
 Timo Flloko	
 Niko Kanxheri
 Rajmonda Bulku

External links
 

1992 films
Albanian-language films
Albanian drama films
1992 drama films